Malvern tram depot is located in Coldblo Road, Armadale, Victoria, a suburb of Stonnington, Australia. Operated by Yarra Trams, it is one of eight tram depots on the Melbourne tram network.

History
Malvern tram depot was opened on 30 May 1910 by the Prahran & Malvern Tramways Trust (PMTT). It was included in the sale of the PMTT to the Melbourne & Metropolitan Tramways Board on 1 March 1920. In 1930 a second tramshed was built on the opposite side of Coldblo Road.

When the Public Transport Corporation was privatised in August 1999, Malvern depot passed to M>Tram. It passed to Yarra Trams when it took control of the entire tram network in April 2004. In January 2005 Coldblo Road that ran between the two sheds with one track was closed to vehicle traffic and two additional tracks laid.

Heritage buildings
The buildings at the depot are listed on the Victorian Heritage Register.

Layout
The main yard has 17 roads, 14 of these inside two sheds and three uncovered roads taking up space in Coldblo Road. A multi-directional single exit/entry track exists.

Rolling stock
As at December 2019, the depot had an allocation of 93 trams: 38 D1 Class and 55 Z3 Class.

Routes
The following routes are operated from Malvern depot:
5: Melbourne University to Malvern
6: Moreland to Glen Iris shared with Brunswick depot
16: Melbourne University to Kew
72: Melbourne University to Camberwell

References

Heritage-listed buildings in Melbourne
Tram depots in Melbourne
Transport infrastructure completed in 1910
1910 establishments in Australia
Transport in the City of Stonnington
Buildings and structures in the City of Stonnington